The 2014 Pacific-Asia Junior Curling Championships was held from January 8 to 14 in Harbin, China. The top finishers of each tournament advanced to the 2014 World Junior Curling Championships in Flims, Switzerland.

Men

Teams

Round Robin Standings
Final Round Robin Standings

Round Robin Results
All draw times are listed in Chinese Standard Time (UTC+8).

Draw 1
Thursday, January 9, 10:00

Draw 2
Thursday, January 9, 16:00

Draw 3
Friday, January 10, 10:00

Draw 4
Friday, January 10, 16:00

Draw 5
Saturday, January 11, 10:00

Draw 6
Saturday, January 11, 16:00

Draw 7
Sunday, January 12, 10:00

Draw 8
Sunday, January 12, 16:00

Draw 9
Monday, January 13, 9:00

Draw 10
Monday, January 13, 14:30

Playoffs

Semifinal
Tuesday, January 14, 9:00

Final
Tuesday, January 14, 14:30

Women

Teams

Round Robin Standings
Final Round Robin Standings

Round Robin Results
All draw times are listed in Chinese Standard Time (UTC+8).

Draw 1
Thursday, January 9, 10:00

Draw 2
Thursday, January 9, 16:00

Draw 3
Friday, January 10, 10:00

Draw 4
Friday, January 10, 16:00

Draw 5
Saturday, January 11, 10:00

Draw 6
Saturday, January 11, 16:00

Draw 7
Sunday, January 12, 10:00

Draw 8
Sunday, January 12, 16:00

Draw 9
Monday, January 13, 9:00

Draw 10
Monday, January 13, 14:30

Playoffs

Semifinal
Tuesday, January 14, 9:00

Final
Tuesday, January 14, 14:30

References

External links
Pacific-Asia Junior Curling Championships 2014 

 
2014 in curling
2014 in Chinese sport
Sport in Harbin
International curling competitions hosted by China 
2014